Phylloporia is a genus of moths of the family Incurvariidae.

Selected species
Phylloporia bistrigella (Haworth, 1828)
Phylloporia latipennella Zeller, 1877

References
Phylloporia at funet

Incurvariidae
Adeloidea genera